Rune Waldekranz (14 September 1911 – 15 May 2003) was a Swedish film producer. He produced more than 50 films between 1942 and 1964. In 1969 at the 6th Guldbagge Awards, he won the award for Special Achievement.

Selected filmography

 I Killed (1943)
 The Rose of Tistelön (1945)
 The Poetry of Ådalen (1947)
 Life in the Finnish Woods (1947)
 The Realm of the Rye (1950)
 Miss Julie (1951)
 Kalle Karlsson of Jularbo (1952)
 U-Boat 39 (1952)
 In Lilac Time (1952)
 She Came Like the Wind (1952)
 Sawdust and Tinsel (1953)
 All the World's Delights (1953)
 Barabbas (1953)
 Ursula, the Girl from the Finnish Forests (1953)
 The Road to Klockrike (1953)
 Karin Månsdotter (1954)
 Storm Over Tjurö (1954)
 Café Lunchrasten (1954)
 Our Father and the Gypsy (1954)
 Dreams (1955)
 The Girl in the Rain (1955)
 Moon Over Hellesta (1956)
 Night Child (1956)
 The Stranger from the Sky (1956)
 The Girl in Tails (1956)
 A Guest in His Own House (1957)
 Seventeen Years Old (1957)
 A Dreamer's Journey (1957)
 Synnöve Solbakken (1957)
 The Koster Waltz (1958)
 We at Väddö (1958)
 The Lady in Black (1958)
 Rider in Blue (1959)
 The Judge (1960)
 The Lady in White (1962)
 Loving Couples (1964)

References

External links

1911 births
2003 deaths
Swedish film producers
Swedish male screenwriters
20th-century Swedish screenwriters
20th-century Swedish male writers